Hurffville may refer to the following places in the U.S. state of New Jersey:
Hurffville, New Jersey, an unincorporated area within Washington Township, Gloucester County
Hurffville School, an elementary school in Hurffville